Johnny Washington (born May 6, 1984) is an American professional baseball coach who is currently the assistant hitting coach for the Chicago Cubs of Major League Baseball (MLB). A native of Long Beach, California, Washington was a second baseman and shortstop during his playing days.

Career
Washington attended Mt. San Jacinto College. The Texas Rangers selected him in the 27th round of the 2003 MLB draft, and he played in minor league and independent league baseball for seven seasons. When he retired in 2009, he was hired by the Los Angeles Dodgers to coach in Minor League Baseball for the Ogden Raptors. In 2013, he coached for the Rancho Cucamonga Quakes. He joined the Padres organization, and coached in 2016 for the San Antonio Missions. The Padres hired Washington to their MLB staff as their first base coach before the 2017 season. He was named as the Padres hitting coach for the 2019 season.

Washington interviewed for the Los Angeles Angels' managerial position following the 2019 season.

Washington was hired as hitting coach for the KBO League's Hanwha Eagles for the 2021 season. On December 13, 2021, Washington was hired by the Chicago Cubs to serve as the team's assistant hitting coach for the 2022 season.

References

External links

1984 births
Living people
African-American baseball coaches
Arizona League Rangers players
Bakersfield Blaze players
Baseball coaches from California
Baseball players from Long Beach, California
Baseball second basemen
Clinton LumberKings players
Florence Freedom players
Inland Empire 66ers of San Bernardino players
Joliet JackHammers players
Major League Baseball first base coaches
Major League Baseball hitting coaches
Minor league baseball coaches
River City Rascals players
San Diego Padres coaches
Spokane Indians players
South Georgia Peanuts players
Sportspeople from Long Beach, California
21st-century African-American sportspeople
20th-century African-American people